The 2013 Kamloops Crown of Curling was held from October 18 to 21 at the Kamloops Curling Club in Kamloops, British Columbia as part of the 2013–14 World Curling Tour. The men's event was held in a round robin format, while the women's event was held in a triple-knockout format. The purse for the men's event was CAD$32,000, of which the winner, Grant Dezura, received CAD$8,000, and the purse for the women's event was CAD$34,000, of which the winner, Allison Pottinger, received CAD$8,000. Dezura defeated Dean Joanisse in the men's final with a score of 5–4, while Pottinger defeated Ayumi Ogasawara of Japan in the final with a score of 3–2.

Men

Teams
The teams are listed as follows:

Round-robin standings
Final round-robin standings

Playoffs

Women

Teams
The teams are listed as follows:

Knockout results

A event

B event

C event

Playoffs

References

External links

Kamloops Crown of Curling, 2013
Sport in Kamloops
Kamloops Crown of Curling
Kamloops Crown of Curling